Pir Ghulam Fareed is a Pakistani politician who was a Member of the Provincial Assembly of the Punjab, from 1985 to 1988 and again from May 2013 to May 2018.

Early life
He was born on 26 December 1942 in Gujranwala.

Political career

He was elected to the Provincial Assembly of the Punjab from Constituency PP-139 (Gujranwala) in 1985 Pakistani general election.

He ran for the seat of the Provincial Assembly of the Punjab as a candidate of Islami Jamhoori Ittehad (IJI) from Constituency PP-87 (Gujranwala-XI) in 1988 Pakistani general election but was unsuccessful. He received 9,279 votes and lost the seat to a candidate of Pakistan Peoples Party (PPP).

He ran for the seat of the Provincial Assembly of the Punjab as an independent candidate from Constituency PP-87 (Gujranwala-XI) in 1997 Pakistani general election but was unsuccessful. He received 1,805 votes and lost the seat to a candidate of Pakistan Muslim League (N) (PML-N.

He was re-elected to the Provincial Assembly of the Punjab as a candidate of PML-N from Constituency PP-95 (Gujranwala-V) in 2013 Pakistani general election.

References

Living people
Punjab MPAs 2013–2018
1942 births
Pakistan Muslim League (N) politicians
Punjab MPAs 1985–1988